Moustapha Guèye (born 19 October 1961) is a Senegalese wrestler. He competed in two events at the 1988 Summer Olympics.

References

External links
 

1961 births
Living people
Senegalese male sport wrestlers
Olympic wrestlers of Senegal
Wrestlers at the 1988 Summer Olympics
Place of birth missing (living people)